Operation Cartoon was a British Commando raid on the island of Stord near Leirvik in Vestland, Norway on the night of  1943. The operation was carried out by 53 men of No. 12 Commando supported by ten men from the Norwegian 10 (IA) Commando (Captain Harald Risnes). RAF Coastal Command co-operated with the Commandos, with aircraft from 18 Group.

Operation
The raiders were transported to Stord by seven Royal Norwegian Navy motor torpedo boats of the 30th MTB Flotilla. Their objective was the destruction of the Pyrite mine on the island. On arrival, half the commandos were landed at Sagvåg quay and engaged German defensive positions, while the remainder were landed on the other side of the bay. The explosive charges put the Stordø Kisgruber mine out of action for a year. As they departed, the torpedo boats attacked a German steamer which they left sinking. The commandos took three German prisoners, papers and equipment, for the loss of one commando killed, two commandos and eight sailors injured.

Aftermath
Admiral John Tovey said afterwards that

and later that month the Norwegians sailed in a whaler to ambush a convoy at Lister light and bring it to Britain. The plan failed and the Norwegians stayed in Norway and at the end of February, hijacked some small vessels and fishing boats to Scotland. The Norwegian MTBs sank two ships in the Norwegian Leads in the middle of March

Footnotes

References

Further reading
 
 

Conflicts in 1943
World War II British Commando raids
1943 in Norway
Battles and operations of World War II involving Norway
Military history of Norway during World War II
History of Vestland
Amphibious operations of World War II
January 1943 events
Amphibious operations involving the United Kingdom